William Meredith may refer to:

 William Meredith (MP), MP for Wootton Bassett
 Billy Meredith (1874–1958), Welsh international winger, oft described as "football's first superstar"
 William Morris Meredith Jr. (1919–2007), American poet and Pulitzer Prize laureate
 William Collis Meredith (1812–1894), Canadian jurist, Chief Justice of Quebec Superior Court
 William Morton Meredith (1835–1917), American director of the Bureau of Engraving and Printing
 William Meredith (surgeon) (1848–1916), American surgeon who practiced in Briton
 William Ralph Meredith (1840–1923), Canadian politician
 William M. Meredith (1799–1873), American lawyer, politician, and U.S. Treasury Secretary

 Sir William Meredith, 3rd Baronet (1725–1790), British politician
 William Meredith (American football) (died 1959), football coach